Symmoca libanicolella is a moth in the family Autostichidae. It was described by Zerny in 1934. It is found in Lebanon.

References

Moths described in 1934
Symmoca